The Lick Observatory is an astronomical observatory owned and operated by the University of California. It is on the summit of Mount Hamilton, in the Diablo Range just east of San Jose, California, United States. The observatory is managed by the University of California Observatories, with headquarters on the University of California, Santa Cruz campus, where its scientific staff moved in the mid-1960s. It is named after James Lick.

The first new moon of Jupiter to be identified since the time of Galileo, Amalthea, the planet's fifth moon, was discovered at this observatory in 1892.

Early history 
Lick Observatory is the world's first permanently occupied mountain-top observatory.
The observatory, in a Classical Revival style structure, was constructed between 1876 and 1887, from a bequest from James Lick of $700,000, .
Lick, originally a carpenter and piano maker, had arrived from Peru in San Francisco, California, in late 1847; after accruing significant wealth he began making various donations in 1873. In his last deed he chose the site atop Mount Hamilton, and was buried there in 1887 under the future site of the telescope, with a brass tablet bearing the inscription, "Here lies the body of James Lick".

Lick additionally negotiated that Santa Clara County construct a "first-class road" to the summit, completed in 1876. Lick chose John Wright, of San Francisco's Wright & Sanders firm of architects, to design both the Observatory and the Astronomer's House. All of the construction materials had to be brought to the site by horse and mule-drawn wagons, which could not negotiate a steep grade. To keep the grade below 6.5%, the road had to take a very winding and sinuous path, which the modern-day road (California State Route 130) still follows. Tradition maintains that this road has exactly 365 turns (although there is uncertainty as to what should count as a turn). The road is closed when there is snow.

The first telescope installed at the observatory was a  refractor made by Alvan Clark. Astronomer E. E. Barnard used the telescope to make "exquisite photographs of comets and nebulae", according to D. J. Warner of Warner & Swasey Company.

In 1880, a  lens was commissioned to Alvan Clark & Sons, for $51,000. Manufacturing of the lens took until 1885 and it was delivered to the observatory on December 29, 1886. Warner & Swasey designed and built the telescope mounting. The telescope, built with this lens, became the world's largest refracting telescope from when it saw first light on January 3, 1888, until the construction of Yerkes Observatory in 1897.

Under the University of California 
In May 1888, the observatory was turned over to the Regents of the University of California,
and it became the first permanently occupied mountain-top observatory in the world. Edward Singleton Holden was the first director. The location provided excellent viewing performance because of lack of ambient light and pollution; additionally, the night air at the top of Mt. Hamilton is extremely calm.  Often a layer of low coastal clouds invades the valley below, especially on nights from late-spring to mid-summer, a phenomenon known in California as the June Gloom.  On nights when the observatory remains above that layer, light pollution can be greatly reduced.

E. E. Barnard used the telescope in 1892 to discover a fifth moon of Jupiter, Amalthea. This was the first addition to Jupiter's known moons since Galileo observed the planet through his parchment tube and spectacle lens. The telescope provided spectra for W. W. Campbell's work on the radial velocities of stars.

In 1905 (Jan. 5 and Feb. 27), Charles Dillon Perrine discovered the sixth and seventh moons of Jupiter (Elara and Himalia) on photographs taken with the 36-inch Crossley reflecting telescope which he had recently rebuilt.

In 1928, Donald C. Shane studied carbon stars, and was able to distinguish them into spectral classes R0–R9 and N0–N7 (on this scale N7 is the reddest and R0 the bluest). This was an expansion of Annie Jump Cannon of Harvard's work on carbon stars that had divided them into R and N types. The N stars have more cyanogen and the R stars have more carbon.

On May 21, 1939, during a nighttime fog that engulfed the summit, a U.S. Army Air Force Northrop A-17 two-seater attack plane crashed into the main building. Because a scientific meeting was being held elsewhere, the only staff member present was Nicholas Mayall. Nothing caught fire and the two individuals in the building were unharmed. 

The pilot of the plane, Lt. Richard F. Lorenz, and passenger Private W. E. Scott were killed instantly. The telephone line was broken by the crash, so no help could be called for at first. Eventually help arrived together with numerous reporters and photographers, who kept arriving almost all night long. Evidence of their numbers could be seen the next day by the litter of flash bulbs carpeting the parking lot. 

The press widely covered the accident and many reports emphasized the luck in not losing a large cabinet of spectrograms which was knocked over by the crash coming through an astronomer's office window. There was no damage to the telescope dome.

In 1950, the California state legislature appropriated funds for a  reflector telescope, which was completed in 1959. The observatory additionally has a  Cassegrain reflector dedicated to photoelectric measurements of star brightness, and received a pair of  astrographs from the Carnegie Corporation.

Time-signal service
In 1886, Lick Observatory begins supplying Railroad Standard Time to the Southern Pacific Railroad, and to other businesses, over telegraph lines. The signal was generated by a clock manufactured by E. Howard & Co. specifically for the Observatory, and which included an electric apparatus for transmitting the time signal over telegraph lines. While most of the nation's railroads received their time signal from the U.S. Naval Observatory time signal via Western Union's telegraph lines, the Lick Observatory Time-Signal was used by railroads from the West coast all the way to Colorado.

21st century

With the growth of San Jose, and the rest of Silicon Valley, light pollution became a problem for the observatory.  In the 1970s, a site in the Santa Lucia Mountains at Junípero Serra Peak, southeast of Monterey, was evaluated for possible relocation of many of the telescopes. However, funding for the move was not available, and in 1980 San Jose began a program to reduce the effects of lighting, most notably replacing all streetlamps with low pressure sodium lamps. The result is that the Mount Hamilton site remains a viable location for a major working observatory. 

The International Astronomical Union named Asteroid 6216 San Jose to honor the city's efforts toward reducing light pollution.

In 2006, there were 23 families in residence, plus typically between two and ten visiting astronomers from the University of California campuses, who stay in dormitories while working at the observatory. The little town of Mount Hamilton atop the mountain has its own police and a post office, and until 2005 had a one-room K-8 school.

In 2008, there were 38 people residing on the mountain; the chef and commons dinner were decommissioned.  By 2013, with continuing budget and staff cuts there remain only about nineteen residents and it is common for the observers to work from remote observing stations rather than make the drive, partly as a result of the business office raising the cost to stay in the dorms. The swimming pool has been closed.

In 2013, one of Lick Observatory's key funding sources was scheduled for elimination in 2018, which many worried would result in the closing of the entire observatory.

In November 2014, the University of California announced its intention to continue support of Lick Observatory.

Telescopes at Lick Observatory are used by researchers from many campuses of the University of California system. Current topics of research carried out at Lick include exoplanets, supernovae, active galactic nuclei, planetary science, and development of new adaptive optics technologies.

In 2015, Google donated $1 million to the observatory over two years.

In August 2020, the observatory was in danger of being destroyed by the rapidly growing SCU Lightning Complex fires. Firefighters were on standby at Lick Observatory to defend the buildings if necessary. As of the evening of August 19, 2020, the fire was on observatory property and moving quickly. While the residences on Mt. Hamilton sustained some damage during the following night, the telescopes and domes survived.

Significant discoveries

The following astronomical objects were discovered at Lick Observatory:
 Measurement of the size of the major moons of Jupiter by A. A. Michelson in 1891
 Several moons of Jupiter
 Amalthea
 Elara
 Himalia
 Sinope
 Near-Earth asteroid (29075) 1950 DA
 Several extrasolar planets
 Quintuple planet system
 55 Cancri
 Triple planet system
 Upsilon Andromedae (with Whipple Observatory)
 Double planet systems
 HD 38529 (with Keck Observatory)
 HD 12661 (with Keck)
 Gliese 876 (with Keck)
 47 Ursae Majoris
The first detection of emission lines in the spectrum of an active galaxy
 The jet emerging from the active nucleus in Messier 87
 The hidden active galactic nucleus in NGC 1068, detected using spectropolarimetry

In addition to observations of natural phenomena, Lick was also the location of the first laser range-finding observation of the Apollo 11 reflector, although this was only for confirmation purposes and no ongoing range-finding work was performed.

Equipment

Below is a list of the nine telescopes   operating at the observatory:
 The C. Donald Shane telescope  reflector (Shane Dome, Tycho Brahe Peak). Its instrumentation includes: 
 The Hamilton spectrometer
 The Kast double spectrograph
 The ShaneAO adaptive optics system with laser guide star
 The Automated Planet Finder  reflector. First light was originally scheduled for 2006.  The telescope finally came into regular use in 2013.
 The Anna L. Nickel  reflector (North (small) Dome, Main Building)
 The Great Lick  refractor (South Dome, Main Building, Observatory Peak)
 The Crossley  reflector (Crossley Dome, Ptolemy Peak)
 The Katzman Automatic Imaging Telescope (KAIT)  reflector (24-inch Dome, Kepler Peak)
 The  Coudé Auxiliary Telescope (Inside of Shane Dome, South wall, Tycho Brahe Peak)
 The Tauchmann  reflector (Tauchmann Dome atop the water tank, Huygens Peak)
 The Carnegie  twin refractor (Double Astrograph Dome, Tycho Brahe Peak)

Below is a list of equipment that formerly operated at the observatory:
 CCD Comet Camera  Nikon camera lens ("The Outhouse" Southwest of the Shane Dome, Tycho Brahe Peak)

See also
 Charles Dillon Perrine
 Harland Epps
 List of astronomical observatories
 List of largest optical refracting telescopes

References

Citations

Sources 

 
 Vasilevskis, S. and Osterbrock, D. E. (1989) "Charles Donald Shane" Biographical Memoirs, Volume 58 pp. 489–512, National Academy of Sciences, Washington, DC, .

Further reading

External links 

 Lick Observatory
 Lick Observatory Archive at UC Santa Cruz
 Lick Observatory Records Digital Archive, from the UC Santa Cruz Library's Digital Collections
 Photographs (1884) from the Paris Observatory Digital library
 The University of California Observatories

 
Astronomical observatories in California
Buildings and structures in Santa Clara County, California
Diablo Range
University of California, Santa Cruz buildings and structures
Astronomy institutes and departments
Research institutes in the San Francisco Bay Area
History of Santa Clara County, California
University of California
Tourist attractions in Santa Clara County, California
Neoclassical architecture in California
1887 establishments in California